Papago is a populated place situated in Maricopa County, Arizona, United States. It is located on the Union Pacific Railroad's Phoenix Subdivision.

References

Populated places in Maricopa County, Arizona